Zoologischer Anzeiger – A Journal of Comparative Zoology is a peer-reviewed scientific journal specialising in the field of comparative zoology. It is included in a number of bibliographic databases:

Animal Breeding Abstracts
Bio-Control News and Information
Biological Abstracts
BIOSIS
CAB Abstracts
Cambridge Scientific Abstracts
Chemical Abstracts
Current Advances in Ecological and Environmental Sciences
Current Contents, Agriculture, Biology & Environmental Sciences
Ecological Abstracts
Elsevier BIOBASE / Current Awareness in Biological Sciences
Elsevier GEO Abstracts
Fisheries Review
Geo Abstracts
GEOBASE
Helminthological Abstracts
Index Veterinarius
NISC - National Information Services Corporation
Oceanographic Literature Review
Referativnyi Zhurnal
Research Alert
Science Citation Index
SciExpanded
SciSearch
Scopus
Veterinary Bulletin
Wildlife Review
Zoological Record

References

External links 

Publications established in 1878
Zoology journals
Quarterly journals
Elsevier academic journals